The 2018 KPIT MSLTA Challenger was a professional tennis tournament played on hard courts. It was the fifth edition of the tournament which was part of the 2018 ATP Challenger Tour. It took place in Pune, India from 19 to 24 November 2018.

Singles main-draw entrants

Seeds

 1 Rankings are as of 12 November 2018.

Other entrants
The following players received wildcards into the singles main draw:
  Aryan Goveas
  Arjun Kadhe
  Sasikumar Mukund
  Manish Sureshkumar

The following player received entry into the singles main draw as a special exempt:
  Saketh Myneni

The following player received entry into the singles main draw as an alternate:
  Nicola Kuhn

The following players received entry from the qualifying draw:
  Sebastian Fanselow
  Lucas Gerch
  Ben Patael
  Francesco Vilardo

The following player received entry as a lucky loser:
  Benjamin Hassan

Champions

Singles

  Elias Ymer def.  Prajnesh Gunneswaran 6–2, 7–5.

Doubles

  Vijay Sundar Prashanth /  Ramkumar Ramanathan def.  Hsieh Cheng-peng /  Yang Tsung-hua 7–6(7–3), 6–7(5–7), [10–7].

References

2018 ATP Challenger Tour
2018
2018 in Indian tennis